Makosini Mishack Chabangu is a South African politician from the Free State. He is a member of the Economic Freedom Fighters (EFF). Chabangu was a Member of the National Assembly of South Africa from 2019 until his resignation in February 2023.

From 2016 until 2019, Chabangu was a permanent delegate to the National Council of Provinces. During his time in the NCOP, he served on the  Select Committee on Trade and International Relations (2016–2019), the Select Committee on Education and Recreation (2016–2019), the Select Committee on Social Services (2016–2019), the Select Committee on Economic and Business Development (2016–2019) and the  Joint Constitutional Review Committee (2018).

After becoming a Member of the Parliament in the National Assembly, he served on the Portfolio Committee on Transport as an alternate member.

Chabangu resigned from Parliament with effect from 2 February 2023.

References

Living people
Year of birth missing (living people)
Sotho people
Members of the National Assembly of South Africa
Members of the National Council of Provinces
21st-century South African politicians
Economic Freedom Fighters politicians